The Cowboys Kickoff Classic was an annual college football game played on the opening weekend of the college football season. It was played in Arlington, Texas, at AT&T Stadium, home of the Dallas Cowboys from 2009 to 2021. The game was originally known as the Cowboys Classic from 2009 to 2014, Advocare Classic from 2015 to 2019, and Allstate Kickoff Classic in 2021. No game was scheduled for 2022.

Game results

Rankings are from the AP Poll.

Game summaries

2009
Founded as the Cowboys Classic, the 2009 game featured the No. 20 BYU Cougars of the Mountain West Conference (MWC) against the No. 3 Oklahoma Sooners of the Big 12 Conference and was played on September 5, 2009. It was the first  college football game played at Cowboys Stadium.  The game was only the second game played by BYU and Oklahoma, with the Cougars upsetting the Sooners 14–13.

2010

The second Cowboys Classic matched the No. 24 Oregon State Beavers of the Pac-12 Conference and the No. 5 TCU Horned Frogs of the Mountain West Conference (MWC) on September 4, 2010.  The Horned Frogs defeated the Beavers 30–21 in front of series low crowd of 46,138.

2011
The third edition paired the No. 4 Oregon Ducks of the Pac-12 Conference against the No. 3 LSU Tigers of the Southeastern Conference (SEC) and was played on September 3, 2011, with the Tigers winning 40–27.

2012
No. 8 Michigan Wolverines of the Big Ten Conference played No. 2 Alabama Crimson Tide of the Southeastern Conference (SEC) on September 1, 2012, the first regular-season meeting between the teams. Alabama won 41–14 in front of an event record attendance of 90,413.

2013
The fifth playing of the Cowboys Classic matched the No. 12 LSU Tigers of the Southeastern Conference (SEC) and the No. 20 TCU Horned Frogs of the Big 12 Conference and was played on August 31, 2013.  The Tigers beat the Horned Frogs 37–27.

2014
The sixth edition featured the Florida State Seminoles of the Atlantic Coast Conference (ACC) and the Oklahoma State Cowboys of the Big 12 Conference, and was played on August 30, 2014 at AT&T Stadium in Arlington, Texas.  It was the fifth meeting between Florida State and Oklahoma State, with the Seminoles leading the series 3–1.  The No. 1 Seminoles defeated the unranked Cowboys 37–31 in front of a crowd of 62,521.

2015
The seventh edition of the Advocare Classic (and the first with Advocare as title sponsor) featured the Alabama Crimson Tide of the Southeastern Conference (SEC) and the Wisconsin Badgers of the Big Ten Conference, and was played on September 5 at AT&T Stadium in Arlington. En route to a national championship, Alabama won their season opener over Wisconsin by a score of 35–17, with eventual Heisman Trophy winner Derrick Henry rushing for 147 yards and three touchdowns. It was the second overall meeting between Alabama and Wisconsin.

2016
The eighth edition of the classic (and the second with Advocare sponsoring the event) featured the top-ranked Alabama Crimson Tide of the Southeastern Conference (SEC) and the #20 USC Trojans of the Pac-12 Conference, played September 3 at AT&T Stadium. The Crimson Tide routed the Trojans 52–6 in front of an announced attendance of 81,359.

2017
The ninth edition of the Advocare classic featured the Michigan Wolverines of the Big Ten Conference versus the Florida Gators of the Southeastern Conference (SEC), played September 2 at AT&T Stadium. It was the fourth meeting between Michigan and Florida (Michigan leads 3–0), and the first ever regular season meeting between the teams. The Wolverines won the game 33–17.

2018
The tenth edition of the Advocare classic featured #25 LSU Tigers of the Southeastern Conference (SEC) against the #8 Miami Hurricanes of the Atlantic Coast Conference (ACC), played September 2 at AT&T Stadium. It was the thirteenth meeting between Miami and LSU (LSU leads 10–3), and their first meeting since the 2005 Peach Bowl. LSU won the game 33–17.

2019
The eleventh edition of the Advocare Classic featured the #11 Oregon Ducks of the Pac-12 Conference against the #16 Auburn Tigers of the Southeastern Conference (SEC), played August 31 at AT&T Stadium.  It was the second meeting between Oregon and Auburn (Auburn leads 1–0), and their first meeting since the 2011 BCS National Championship Game. After being down by 15 in the third quarter, Auburn came from behind to win 27–21, scoring the winning touchdown with 9 seconds remaining.

2021
After missing 2020 due to the COVID-19 pandemic, the game was played again in 2021 between Stanford and Kansas State. The Wichita Eagle reported that the stadium attendance of 28,668 was mostly filled with Kansas State fans. The final score was Kansas State 24, Stanford 7.

Records

By team

By conference

References

External links
 

College football kickoff games
American football in the Dallas–Fort Worth metroplex
Sports in Arlington, Texas
2009 establishments in Texas
Recurring sporting events established in 2009